Aipichthyoides is an extinct genus of prehistoric bony fish that lived during the lower Cenomanian.

See also

 Prehistoric fish
 List of prehistoric bony fish

References

Late Cretaceous fish
Polymixiiformes
Late Cretaceous fish of Asia